The KPV-14.5 heavy machine gun (KPV is an initialism for Krupnokaliberniy Pulemyot Vladimirova (large-caliber machine gun Vladimirov), in Russian as Крупнокалиберный Пулемёт Владимирова, or КПВ) is a Soviet designed 14.5×114mm-caliber heavy machine gun, which first entered service as an infantry weapon (designated PKP) in 1949. In the 1960s, the infantry version was taken out of production because it was too large and heavy. It was later redesigned for anti-aircraft use, because it showed excellent results as an AA gun, with a range of 3,000 meters horizontally and 2,000 meters vertically against low flying planes. It was used in the ZPU series of anti-aircraft guns. Its size and power also made it a useful light anti-armour weapon on the BTR series of vehicles and the BRDM-2 scout car.

Mechanics
The KPV was a heavy machine gun developed by S. V. Vladimirov. It was developed in 1944 and adopted in 1949. It combines the rate of fire of a heavy machine gun with the armor-piercing capabilities of antitank rifles and was designed to combat lightly armored targets, firepower and manpower of the enemy located behind light cover, as well as to be an anti-aircraft machine gun. The muzzle energy of the KPV reaches 31 kJ (for comparison, the 12.7 mm Browning M2HB machine gun has 17 kJ, the 20 mm ShVAK aircraft mounted gun has about 28 kJ). It is one of the most powerful machine guns ever used by the Soviet and later Russian armed forces. The development of the machine gun began in 1944. The 14.5×114mm M41 cartridge can be used with high explosive incendiary - tracer (HEI-T) or armor-piercing incendiary (API) bullets. The KPV is air-cooled and fitted with a barrel with a hard chrome plated bore. It uses a short recoil operation system with gas assistance and a rotary bolt. It can be fed with the 40-round metallic belt from either the left or right side. The barrel can be removed by turning the prominent latch on the forward end of the receiver and pulling on the barrel's carrying handle.

Versions

KPVT
The version for use in armored vehicles is called the KPVT (tankoviy, 'tank'). KPVT is used for armored vehicle installations, boats, movable and stationary mounts and various antiaircraft mounts. It features a shorter receiver and a heavier barrel jacket. The KPVT also uses a 50-round belt instead of the original 40-round belt. KPVTs are the primary armament of the wheeled BTR-60PB/70/80 series armored personnel carriers and BRDM-2 armored reconnaissance vehicles. It is intended for fighting against lightly armored targets, weapons systems and light shelters at the distances of up to 3,000 m, as well as air targets at distances up to 2,000 m.

The distance at which the bullet retains lethal force is 8 km. The maximum flight range of the bullet is 9 km.

Naval armament
The naval version was called the "marine tumbovaya" (MTPU). It was mounted in the following turrets; 2M-5 was for torpedo boats, the 2M-6 for patrol boats, and the 2M-7 for trawlers. The 14.5 mm marine pedestal machine gun mount (14.5 mm MTPU) is intended for combat against armored surface, coast and air targets. It is mounted on decks of boats and can defeat surface and coast targets with a range of 3,000 meters horizontally and 2,000 meters vertically against low flying planes.

ZPU 

The ZPU is a towed anti-aircraft gun based on the KPV. It entered service with the Soviet Union in 1949 and is used by over 50 countries worldwide.

 ZPU-1 single barrel
 ZPU-2 double-barreled 
 ZPU-4 quadruple-barreled

Remote weapon stations
The Emirati remote weapon station IGG-RWS14 uses the KPV machine gun.

Gallery

Ammunition
 B-32 - Armor-piercing incendiary full metal jacket round with a tungsten-carbide core. Projectile weight is 64.4 g and muzzle velocity is 976 m/s. Armor penetration at 500 m is 32 mm of rolled homogeneous armour (RHA) at 90 degrees.
 BZT - Armor-piercing incendiary tracer full metal jacket round with a steel core. Projectile weight is 59.56 g and muzzle velocity is 1,005 m/s. Tracer burns to at least 2,000 m.
 MDZ - High-explosive incendiary bullet of instant action. Projectile weight is 59.68 g.

Rounds are also produced by Bulgaria, China, Egypt, Poland, and Romania.

Operators

 
 
 
 
 
 
 
 : locally produced
 
 
 
 : Type 56 (KPV) and Type 58 (KPVT) machine guns, produced by Norinco
 
  (ex)
 
 
 
  (KPVT)
 
 
 
  - Manufactured at Ordnance Factory Tiruchirappalli
 - Iraqi armed forces
 Popular Mobilization Forces
 
 
 
 
 Izz ad-Din al-Qassam Brigades
 
 
 
 
  - Armed and Security Forces of Mali
  - North Korea-made KPVs
 
 
 
 
 
 
 : Used by the Pakistan Army.
 
 
 : KPV and KPVT built under license
 
 
 
  (KPVT)
 : Chinese QJG56 and Polish KPVT
  (KPVT)
 
 
  (ex)

See also

 List of Russian weaponry

References

External links

 KPVT large-calibre tank machine-gun
 MTPU 14.5mm marine pedestal machine-gun mount
 Russian/Soviet KPV MACHINE GUN ON WHEELED MOUNT (MARKOV'S MOUNT) IN 14.5 x 114 calibre (M41/44) – Walk around photos
 ZPU-2 - TWIN MOUNT 14.5MM ANTI-AIRCRAFT GUNS (Twin mount anti-aircraft 14.5mm KPV machine guns) – Walk around photos 
 Modern Firearms page on the KPV-14.5 heavy machine gun 

14.5×114mm machine guns
Heavy machine guns
Machine guns of the Soviet Union
Degtyarev Plant products
Weapons and ammunition introduced in 1949